Townshend is a small village near Leedstown and Godolphin and the River Hayle. At one time it was a thriving community with a pub, post office, shop, butchers and a chapel, but these have now all closed.  It is a quiet and peaceful village, close to the major towns of Penzance, Hayle, Helston and Camborne. The village hall is still functional, with many events held through the year.

External links 

 Townshend Village Hall web site

Villages in Cornwall